Bali Mandara Toll Road or Nusa Dua-Ngurah Rai-Benoa Toll Road is a toll road carried by a bridge stretching across the Gulf of Benoa 12.7 km in length. The Rp 2.48 Trillion (USD 220 million) highway connects the city of Denpasar and South Kuta, Badung Regency, Nusa Dua and Ngurah Rai International Airport. The reason behind construction of Bali Mandara Toll Road was to prevent traffic jams on the Ngurah Rai Bypass Road, previously the only road connecting areas of Bali south of the airport with areas north of the airport. The Ngurah Rai Bypass Road, a land-based route, could not be widened because of the location of the airport runway.  Consequently, the Bali Mandara Toll Road was built over water.

History
Bali Mandara Toll Road began construction in March 2012 and was completed in October 2013. The road was officially opened on 23 September 2013 by President Susilo Bambang Yudhoyono. At the 2013 APEC Summit in Bali, the toll road was passed by several state leaders. The toll road undergone a beautification and other adjustments in preparation for the 2022 G20 Bali Summit.

Names
The name Bali Mandara was given by President Susilo Bambang Yudhoyono at the inauguration of the toll road on September 23, 2013. Mandara itself means Maju, Aman, Damai, dan Sejahtera (progressive, safe, peaceful and prosperous); however, the name considered more political because it is identical with the slogan coined by Governor of Bali at the time Made Mangku Pastika during his tenure.

In 2018, there was a plan to change the name into I Gusti Ngurah Rai Bridge, to honor local hero I Gusti Ngurah Rai and since the toll road is situated within I Gusti Ngurah Rai International Airport vicinity.

Exits

Gallery

References

Toll roads in Indonesia
Bridges in Indonesia
Bridges completed in 2013
Transport in Bali
Toll bridges